The Alliance for Audited Media (AAM) is a North American non-profit industry organization founded in 1914 by the Association of National Advertisers to help ensure media transparency and trust among advertisers and media companies. Originally known as the Audit Bureau of Circulations (ABC), today AAM is a source of verified media information and technology platform certifications, providing standards, audit services and data for the advertising and publishing industries. It is one of more than three dozen such organizations operating worldwide, affiliated with the International Federation of Audit Bureaux of Circulations (IFABC).

AAM independently verifies print and digital circulation, mobile apps, website analytics, social media, technology platforms and audience information for newspapers, magazines and digital media companies in the U.S. and Canada. In the digital advertising space, AAM is a provider of technology certification audits to industry standards established by the Interactive Advertising Bureau, Media Rating Council, Trustworthy Accountability Group and Mobile Marketing Association.

History 
At the turn of the 20th century, the Association of National Advertisers (ANA) observed a market need for verifiable, authenticated circulation figures from print publishers. As a result, in 1914, advertisers, ad agencies and publishers in the U.S. and Canada united to form the first Audit Bureau of Circulations to bring trust and accountability to the print media market.

On November 15, 2012, ABC in North America rebranded its organization as the Alliance for Audited Media to reflect the new media environment and its members' evolving business models.

Governance 
AAM is governed by a tripartite board of directors composed of leaders in publishing, marketing and advertising from the U.S. and Canada. Together with an extensive network of committees, the AAM board sets the standards by which print and digital media are measured and reported. AAM audited data is relied upon by marketers and ad agencies to plan for and buy media. This information is housed in an AAM database, disseminated via several complementary industry data providers (such as Gfk MRI and Kantar Media SRDS) and fed directly to proprietary databases of many large ad agencies and client-side marketers.

The organization is headquartered in Lisle, Illinois with an additional office in Toronto.

Membership 
Membership is open to all publishers, digital media companies, advertisers and advertising agencies. Additionally, any individual, firm or corporation that requires access to media data may apply for an associate membership. AAM serves as an industry forum, connecting advertisers, ad agencies and publishers to discuss issues and trends and set standards.

See also 
 Audit Bureau of Circulations
 Newspaper circulation
 International Federation of Audit Bureaux of Circulations (ABC)

References

External links 
 Alliance for Audited Media
 Audit Bureau of Circulations (UK)
 International Federation of Audit Bureaux of Circulations
Non-profit organizations based in Illinois
Publishing organizations
Newspapers circulation audit